Baptiste Mousset (born 11 March 1894, date of death unknown) was a French racing cyclist. He rode in the 1926 Tour de France.

References

1894 births
Year of death missing
French male cyclists
Place of birth missing